Gołuchów Castle is an early Renaissance castle built in 1550-1560 on a square plan and used as a defensive stronghold and residence. The castle is located in Gołuchów, Greater Poland Voivodeship; in Poland.

History

This early-Renaissance castle was raised in between 1550-1560 close by Trzemna, as small river and estuary of the Prosna. The building was built for Voivode of the Brześć Kujawski Voivodeship, Rafał Leszczyński. The castle was predominantly used for defensive purposes with keeps in the corners of the structure. The subsequent owners expanded the residence – making the residence into a magnate Renaissance stronghold. In 1853, the partially run-down castle was bought by Count Tytus Działyński, for his son Jan Kantega and his wife Princess Izabela Czartoryska. The castle was reconstructed in the nineteenth century, in the style of the French Renaissance; the residence is surrounded by the largest Landscape Park in Greater Poland Voivodeship, which asserted additional Romanesque and English architectural styles upon the castle. After the Second World War the castle housed the Branch of the National Museum in Poznań (Polish: Muzeum Narodowe w Poznaniu).

Gallery

See also
 Castles in Poland

References

Buildings and structures completed in 1560
Castles in Greater Poland Voivodeship
Pleszew County